The River Market (formerly known as Westport Landing, the City Market, and River Quay) is a riverfront neighborhood in Kansas City, Missouri that comprises the first and oldest incorporated district in Kansas City. It stretches north of the downtown Interstate 70 loop to the Missouri River, and is bordered by the Buck O'Neil Bridge on the west and the Heart of America Bridge on the east. , the population was 1,345.

History

Starting in 1821, the area was an early French fur trading post operated by François Chouteau of the powerful Chouteau clan. The name "Westport Landing" is derived from having been the dock on the Missouri River for the exchange of goods destined for the community of Westport three miles to the south on higher ground that was operated by John Calvin McCoy. He was to lead a group of settlers to create the Town of Kansas in this location in 1850 which in turn became the City of Kansas in 1853. This made it the first and oldest incorporated district in what is now Kansas City. In the mid 1800s, the public square was located in what is now the southern section of the large farmers' market. What is now the City Market area was previously known as River Quay, and was the site of many mob activities, including car bombs.

The Quay name was applied to the neighborhood in the 1970s by developer Marion A. Trozzolo to capitalize on the neighborhood's early French connections. His vision was to make this neighborhood a destination for restaurants and bohemian shops.

The area encompasses the location of Kansas City's founding.

Current
The large riverfront warehouses have become increasingly developed into residential lofts, restaurants, bars, shops, cafes, and ethnic markets. Since its inception in 1857, the City Market has been one of the largest and most enduring public farmers' markets in the Midwest, linking growers and small businesses to the Kansas City community. There are more than 40 full-time tenants that are open year-round with an eclectic mix of independently owned shops and dining. There is a Farmers Market that features local vendors every weekend of the year. The Arabia Steamboat Museum at 400 Grand Blvd. is a popular tourist attraction displaying thousands of artifacts from a steamboat and its cargo that had sunk nearby in 1856 and was recovered in 1987–88.

The manager of the market on behalf of the City of Kansas City is KC Commercial Realty Group. The official neighborhood association for the River Market neighborhood is the River Market Community Association.

See also
List of neighborhoods in Kansas City, Missouri

References

External links

River Market Community Association
Arabia Steamboat Museum
Downtown Neighborhood Association
KC Police Memorial History

Economy of Kansas City, Missouri
Neighborhoods in Kansas City, Missouri
Downtown Kansas City